The Treaty of Bongaya (also spelled Bongaja) was signed on November 18, 1667 between Sultan Hasanudin of Gowa and the Dutch East India Company (VOC). This treaty was developed after Dutch imperial forces (allied with the Bugis) defeated the Gowan forces at Makassar. Based on the terms of the agreement, Sultan Hasanudin officially recognized the VOC's influence in Indonesian territories (VOC recognition by the sultan was unofficially established in 1667). As a result, major restrictions were placed on Gowa's ability to trade. The treaty declared that all traders from Gowa required a license in order to do business in regions controlled by the Dutch East India Company. These territories included Buton, Makassar, Timor, Bima and the coasts of Java.

See also
List of treaties

References
Nguyen-Long, Kerry. Vietnamese Ceramic Trade to the Philippines in the Seventeenth Century. Journal of Southeast Asian Studies. Volume: 30, Issue 1, Page 1, 1999. 

Bongaja
1667 treaties
Bongaja
1667 in the Dutch Republic